The 2016 St. Petersburg Ladies' Trophy was a professional tennis tournament played on indoor hard courts. This was the seventh edition of the tournament and the first as a WTA Premier tournament. It was part of the 2016 WTA Tour and was held between 8 February and 14 February 2016.

Point distribution

Prize money

1Qualifiers prize money is also the Round of 32 prize money.
*per team

Singles main draw entrants

Seeds

1 Rankings as of February 1, 2016.

Other entrants
The following players received wildcards into the singles main draw:
  Elena Vesnina
  Natalia Vikhlyantseva
  Caroline Wozniacki

The following players received entry from the qualifying draw:
  Klára Koukalová
  Kateryna Kozlova
  Tamira Paszek
  Kateřina Siniaková

The following player received entry as lucky losers:
  Laura Siegemund
  Patricia Maria Țig

Withdrawals
  Mona Barthel → replaced by  Tímea Babos
  Irina-Camelia Begu → replaced by  Jeļena Ostapenko
  Petra Cetkovská → replaced by  Daria Kasatkina
  Alizé Cornet (low back injury) → replaced by  Patricia Maria Țig
  Alexandra Dulgheru → replaced by  Kirsten Flipkens
  Karin Knapp → replaced by  Bojana Jovanovski
  Anna Karolína Schmiedlová (ankle sprain) → replaced by  Laura Siegemund

Doubles main draw entrants

Seeds

1 Rankings as of February 8, 2016.

Other entrants 
The following pair received a wildcard into the doubles main draw:
  Anastasia Bukhanko /  Dominika Cibulková

Retirements
  Monica Niculescu (abdominal injury)

Champions

Singles

  Roberta Vinci defeated  Belinda Bencic 6–4, 6–3

Doubles

  Martina Hingis /  Sania Mirza defeated  Vera Dushevina /  Barbora Krejčíková 6–3, 6–1

References

External links
 *Official website

St. Petersburg Ladies' Trophy
St. Petersburg Ladies Trophy
2016 in Russian women's sport
February 2016 sports events in Russia
2016 in Russian tennis